This is Class War is the first and only LP released by the Boston-based band Milligram. It was first released on the Jenkins's label TRAKTOR7 Records in 2002. It was re-released by Small Stone Records in 2003.

History
The first 14 tracks from This is Class War were originally released in early 2002, in a limited pressing of 300 hand-stamped CDRs, sewn completely into cloth camouflage sleeves, with hand stamped, hand numbered digipaks, on TRAKTOR7 Records. The band broke up in summer 2002. In February 2003, Small Stone Records re-released the album. The latter version contains, in addition to the 14 original songs, more than 30 minutes of additional music, including most of the outtakes, some remixes (drums and voice only, to illustrate that a majority of the distortion is on the drums) plus tracks of the ambient/noise (generated on a Mac G3/266, in SoundEdit) that used to be played before and during Milligram live sets.

Track listing
2002 - original release (TRAKTOR7 Records)

2003 - Small Stone Records re-issue (bonus tracks)

References

2003 debut albums
Milligram (band) albums